is a former Japanese football player. His younger brother Tatsunori Yamagata is also footballer.

Playing career
Yamagata was born in Kitakyushu on September 7, 1981. After graduating from high school, he joined J1 League club Sanfrecce Hiroshima in 2000. However he could hardly play in the match and the club was relegated to J2 League from 2003. In 2004, he moved to J2 club Avispa Fukuoka based in his local. He became a regular player and the club was promoted to J1 from 2006. His younger brother Tatsunori Yamagata also joined the club from 2005 and played together. However he could hardly play in the match in 2006 and the club was relegated to J2 in a year. In 2007, he became a regular player again. In 2008, he moved to Regional Leagues club V-Varen Nagasaki. He played many matches and retired end of 2008 season.

Club statistics

References

External links

1981 births
Living people
Association football people from Fukuoka Prefecture
Japanese footballers
J1 League players
J2 League players
Sanfrecce Hiroshima players
Avispa Fukuoka players
V-Varen Nagasaki players
Association football midfielders